The 1997–98 DFB-Pokal was the 55th season of the annual German football cup competition. 64 teams competed in the tournament of six rounds which began on 14 August 1997 and ended on 16 May 1998. In the final Bayern Munich defeated MSV Duisburg 2–1 thereby claiming their ninth title.

Matches

First round

Second round

Round of 16

Quarter-finals

Semi-finals

Final

References

External links
 Official site of the DFB 
 Kicker.de 

1997-98
1997–98 in German football cups